Saiye (also, Saive) is a settlement in Sissala East Municipal District, Upper West Region in northern Ghana.

References

Populated places in Sissala East Municipal District